The 1973 North Hertfordshire District Council election was held on 7 June 1973. It was the first election to North Hertfordshire District Council, and was held at the same time as other local elections across England for the new non-metropolitan district councils that were created under the Local Government Act 1972. The elected councillors initially formed a shadow authority to oversee the transition to the new system, operating alongside the five outgoing district councils until 1 April 1974 when the new district formally came into being.

The election saw the Conservatives form the largest party on the council, albeit falling a couple of seats short of having a majority, leaving the council under no overall control. The Conservatives formed a minority administration, with their group leader, Bob Flatman, becoming the first leader of the council.

Overall results
The overall results were as follows:

Ward results
The new district was divided into 18 numbered wards, electing between one and four councillors each to give a total of 48 councillors:
Ward 1 was the Baldock Urban District.
Wards 2–6 were the wards of Hitchin Urban District.
Wards 7–11 were the wards of Letchworth Urban District.
Ward 12 was the Royston Urban District.
Wards 13–18 were all groups of civil parishes from Hitchin Rural District.

The results for each ward were as follows:

References

1973 English local elections
1973